Elisabeta Polihroniade (née Ionescu; 24 April 1935 – 23 January 2016) was a Romanian chess player holding the title of Woman Grandmaster (WGM), and an International Arbiter (1986). She was born in Bucharest.

She won the Romanian Women's Championship in 1966, 1970, 1971, 1972, 1975, 1976 and 1977. Polihroniade played for Romania in the Women's Chess Olympiads of 1966, 1969, 1972, 1974, 1978, 1980, 1982, 1984, 1986 and 1988.

Her peak rating was 2391, achieved in February 1992,.

Polihroniade was a journalist and broadcaster, with her own daily radio programme on contemporary culture. She was the editor of Gambit, the Romanian chess magazine, and wrote many books.

Notable chess games
Valentina Kozlovskaya vs Elisabeta Polihroniade, 3rd olw final 1966, Modern Defense (A42), 0-1
Elisabeta Polihroniade vs Leonid Shamkovich, Cup World (open) 1989, Sicilian Defense (B43), 1-0

References

External links

Elisabeta Polihroniade chess games at 365Chess.com
Obituary - Elisabeta Polihroniade, FIDE

1935 births
2016 deaths
Chess woman grandmasters
Romanian female chess players
Chess arbiters
Chess players from Bucharest
Place of death missing